John Cowper Granbery (1829–1907) was an American Confederate chaplain and bishop of the Southern Methodist Episcopal church.

Early life
John Cowper Granbery was born on December 5, 1829 in Norfolk, Virginia. He graduated from Randolph-Macon College in 1848.

Career
Granbery entered the Methodist ministry and served as assistant preacher and missioner in Washington, Richmond, and Petersburg. He was a chaplain on the campus of the University of Virginia from 1859 to 1861. During the American Civil War of 1861–1865, Granberry served as a chaplain in the Confederate States Army.

Granberry was a professor of moral philosophy and practical theology in Vanderbilt University from 1875 to 1882. He was elected Bishop in the Southern Methodist church in 1882.

Personal life and death
Granberry married Jenny Massie in 1858. They had a child. He married his second wife, Ella Winston, in 1882, and they had eight children.

Granbery died on April 1, 1907 in Ashland, Virginia.

Bibliography
A Bible Dictionary (1882)
Twelve Sermons (1896)
Experience, The Crowning Evidence of the Christian Religion (1901)

See also
 List of bishops of the United Methodist Church

References

1829 births
1907 deaths
Writers from Norfolk, Virginia
Vanderbilt University faculty
Confederate States Army chaplains
American sermon writers
Bishops of the Methodist Episcopal Church, South
Methodist chaplains
American religious writers
Southern Methodists
19th-century American clergy